Administrative Council elections were held in Dahomey for the first time in 1925.

Background
The Administrative Council was established in 1894, Although it had no elected members, the Chamber of Commerce selected some of the councillors. However, three elected seats were introduced in 1925.

Electoral system
Three constituencies were created for the elections, Abomey, Ouidah and Porto-Novo. The franchise was extremely restricted, with only 470 people registered to vote.

Results
Two of the three seats were won by candidates supported by the French colonial authorities. However, Pierre Johnson was elected in Ouidah despite opposition from the French.

References

1925 elections in Africa
1925
1925 in French Dahomey
1925